''Shudhu Tomari'' Taglines 'Unending Love Story') is 
an Indian Love Sad Drama Bengali Tele film released in 27 Dec 2013 directed by Rajkumar Patra. 
Rajkumar launched his first directorial & Lead starred debut which he also wrote. Alongside with co-actress Priyanka Saha.
Patra played lead role as character Raja. A Social worker middle-class boy Raja fall in love with a high status simple girl.

Cast 
 
Rajkumar Patra as Raj Chatterjee, Raja
Priyanka Saha as Sawanti Ganguly
Raj s Giri as Rohit Ganguly
Manoranjan Jana as Ajit Chatterjee
Sayan Chakraborty as Subrata Bandyopadayay
Manisha Dutta as Mitali Chatterjee
Sanjay Pal as Monty
Gopal as Rudra
Soma Adhikari as Shila
Rocky Rupkumar Patra as Rockor (Guest)
Aloke Singha as Shankar Panda
Avishek Mondol as Avik
Barun Singha Deb as Boys Of Shankar
Surojeet Das as Boy On The Bike
Ronty Hazra as Joga

Soundtrack
A soundtrack album for those song was released and copyrighted by 'Raga Music'

Release 
Sudhu Tomari was released on 27 December 2013 West Bengal.
In 14 Jan 2014, It was Special Screening on D.M Hall at Jhargram. Later on it was also screening in low budget Movie Premier in 'Hello Kolkata' at Kolkata.

Critical reception
Sudhu Tomari Tele flick was poorly received by critics and audiences reason of his sound quality is noisy unclear in some scenes. 
And its story similar from Bollywood film starred Salman Khan.

Accolades
Rajkumar receive a best performing & Tele film actor special honour Awards for Sudhu Tomari on 2013 at D.M Hall Show.

References

External links 
 Sudhu Tomari at the Internet Movie Database (IMDb)
 Official Facebook Page
 Pinterest Pictures, Still Gallery 
 Sudhu Tomari HD Wallpaper in

2013 films
Bengali-language Indian films
2010s Bengali-language films